Hemaris venata is a moth of the family Sphingidae. It is known from Seram and Papua New Guinea.

The antenna is slender with a long hook. The underside of the thorax, legs, abdomen and apex of the anal tuft are yellow.

References

V
Moths of Papua New Guinea
Moths of New Guinea
Moths of Indonesia
Moths described in 1861